The 3rd Colorado Infantry Regiment was an infantry regiment during the American Civil War from the state of Colorado.  In October 1863, the 3rd Colorado Infantry was consolidated with the 2nd Colorado Infantry Regiment and the subsequent formation was re-designated as the 2nd Colorado Cavalry Regiment. 


Formation
In the fall of 1862, Governor John Evans began organizing the 3rd Colorado Infantry Regiment. Starting in September companies were organized under direction of the regiment's first commander Colonel William Larimer, and his deputy, Lieutenant Colonel Samuel S. Curtis. The regiment was garrisoned at Camp Weld during its training. During the regiment's formation, there was an understanding that Col. Larimer's command was temporary as the regiment's command was intended for James H. Ford, who was serving with 2nd Colorado Infantry Regiment. However there was fierce competition for recruits in the Colorado territory and Col. Larimer was only able to raise five companies and portions of sixth. In December, Col. Larimer resigned his position in the regiment.

Operations
On March 5, 1863, the 3rd Colorado Infantry Regiment departed Camp Weld and marched to Fort Leavenworth, Kansas.

See also
List of Colorado Territory Civil War units

References

Attribution
 

Units and formations of the Union Army from Colorado
Military units and formations established in 1862
1862 establishments in Colorado Territory
Military units and formations disestablished in 1863